Logan Stankoven (born February 26, 2003) is a Canadian ice hockey forward for the Kamloops Blazers of the Western Hockey League (WHL) as a prospect to the Dallas Stars of the National Hockey League (NHL). He was drafted in the second round, 47th overall, by the Stars in the 2021 NHL Entry Draft.

Playing career
In his first full major junior season in 2019–20, Stankoven scored 29 goals and 48 points in 59 games with the Kamloops Blazers of the WHL. He missed an opportunity to become the first 16 year old player to score 30 goals in a season since Nolan Patrick in 2014–15 as a result of the league shutting down early with 5 games left on Kamloops' schedule due to COVID-19.

Following his selection by the Dallas Stars in the second-round, 47th overall, of the 2021 NHL Entry Draft, Stankoven was signed to a three-year, entry-level contract on September 29, 2021. 

Stankoven won several awards for his performance in the 2021–22 season for Kamloops. He was a First Team All-Star in the BC Division and won the Four Broncos Memorial Trophy as the WHL's best player. He also received the CHL Player of the Year award as the Canadian Hockey League best player. Stankoven also won the Brad Hornung Trophy as the most sportsmanlike player of the WHL.

In the 2022 WHL playoffs, Stankoven led all players with 17 goals and 31 points.

International play

Stankoven was a part of the 2021 U18 Gold Medal winning team for Canada scoring a goal in the final against Russia.
Stankoven was initially named to Team Canada in the 2022 World Junior Ice Hockey Championships that was scheduled to be played in December 2021 and January 2022, but the tournament was cancelled due to the COVID-19 pandemic after Stankoven had played only one game.

Stankoven returned to join Team Canada for the 2022 World Junior Ice Hockey Championships, winning gold with the team. With four goals and six assists in the seven-game tournament, he was named one of the team's three best players.

On December 12, 2022, Stankoven was again named to Team Canada to compete at the 2023 World Junior Ice Hockey Championships and won a gold medal.

Career statistics

Regular season and playoffs

International

References

External links
 

2003 births
Living people
Canadian ice hockey forwards
Dallas Stars draft picks
Ice hockey people from British Columbia
Kamloops Blazers players
Sportspeople from Kamloops
21st-century Canadian people